The 2023 Kazakhstan Premier League is the 32nd season of the Kazakhstan Premier League, the highest football league competition in Kazakhstan. FC Astana are the defending champions after winning their seventh title the previous season.

Events

Teams
Akzhayik, Turan and Taraz were all relegated at the end of the 2022 season. They were replaced by Okzhetpes, Kaisar and Zhetysu from the Kazakhstan First League.

Team overview

Personnel and kits

Note: Flags indicate national team as has been defined under FIFA eligibility rules. Players and Managers may hold more than one non-FIFA nationality.

Foreign players
The number of foreign players is restricted to eight per KPL team. A team can use only five foreign players on the field in each game.
From the 2020 season, the KFF announced that players from countries of the Eurasian Economic Union would not be counted towards a club's foreign player limit.

For transfers during the season, see Winter 2022–23 transfers and Summer 2023 transfers.

In bold: Players that have been capped for their national team.

Managerial changes

Regular season

League table

Results

Results table

Results by match played

Positions by round

Statistics

Scoring
 First goal of the season: Bauyrzhan Islamkhan for Ordabasy against Caspiy

Top scorers

Clean sheets

References

External links
Official website 

Kazakhstan Premier League seasons
1
Kazakh
Kazakh